Raquel Robles is an Argentine writer, journalist and teacher. She was born in Santa Fe in 1971. 

She is known both for her work as a literature teacher for marginalized youth, being responsible for various integration projects, and for her novel Perder for which she won the Premio Clarín de Novela in 2008. 

She is also the author of the books Pequeños combatientes, a book about the children of the disappeared in Argentina, and La dieta de las malas noticias, a dark comedy about love and family.

She was a member of the HIJOS group for ten years. She wrote has written for the newspaper Página/12 and the magazines Tres puntos and El Planeta Urbano.

References

Argentine writers